Robert Ryan (1882 – 23 April 1952) was an Irish politician and farmer. He was an unsuccessful candidate at the June 1927 and September 1927 general elections, but was elected to Dáil Éireann as a Fianna Fáil Teachta Dála (TD) for the Limerick constituency at the 1932 general election. He was re-elected at each subsequent general election until he lost his seat at the 1951 general election. From the 1948 general election, he was elected for the Limerick East constituency.

References

1882 births
1952 deaths
Fianna Fáil TDs
Members of the 7th Dáil
Members of the 8th Dáil
Members of the 9th Dáil
Members of the 10th Dáil
Members of the 11th Dáil
Members of the 12th Dáil
Members of the 13th Dáil
Irish farmers
Politicians from County Limerick